Moultrie Patten (June 10, 1919 – March 18, 2009) was an American actor and jazz musician. Patten was perhaps best known for his role as Walt the trapper on the American television series Northern Exposure, which aired from 1990 until 1995. Patten appeared as Walt Kupfer from 1993 until the show's ending in 1995.

Biography

Early life 
Moultrie Patten was born on June 10, 1919. He was raised in Detroit, Michigan, where he worked a local theater and studied the piano. Patten attended Brown University, where he continued to pursue acting.

He was drafted into the United States military during World War II. He served as a tank commander during the Battle of Monte Cassino, for which he received a Silver Star for heroism in 1944.

Career 
Patten moved to New York City following the end of World War II to pursue his acting career. He would spend more than fifty years performing in Broadway theater, regional theater, film, television, and even vaudeville. Patten once described his favorite theater roles as The Hostage, The Andersonville Trial, and Noises Off.

Patten's earliest television credits included Route 66, Philco Television Playhouse and Hallmark Hall of Fame. Later , Miami Vice (TV series) (4x13 - 1988) His film roles included The Temp, Free Willy and The Favor.

Patten moved to Portland, Oregon, in 1990, and later relocated to Beaverton, Oregon. He was cast as Walt Kupfer on the hit television show Northern Exposure, from 1993 until 1995. His character quickly became a fixture on the show and a fan favorite. Fans of Northern Exposure still sought out Patten for his autograph years after the show's production ended in 1995.

Patten continued acting, especially in television commercials, into his 80s.

He also pursued a career as a jazz musician and played the piano at jazz clubs throughout the American Midwest and East Coast. Patten released a CD featuring his favorite recordings in 1997.

Death 
Moultrie Patten died from pneumonia in Beaverton, Oregon, on March 18, 2009, at the age of 89. He was survived by his daughter, Sarah Goforth; sons, Moultrie Patten Jr. and Henry Bigelow Patten (aka Rex Alexander); a sister, Jane Dias; and his former wife, Teena Patten.

Patten's funeral was held at the Ross Hollywood Chapel in Portland, Oregon, on March 27, 2009. He was buried at Arlington National Cemetery with full military honors on May 28, 2009.

In an interview with The Oregonian following his death, Patten's daughter, Sarah Goforth, explained her father's acting philosophy saying, "Anyone who pursues the arts is really creating another world for themselves, because the one they are faced with does not, in some way, suit them."

References

External links 
 

1919 births
2009 deaths
American male stage actors
American male television actors
American male film actors
American jazz pianists
American male pianists
Burials at Arlington National Cemetery
United States Army personnel of World War II
Recipients of the Silver Star
Brown University alumni
People from Beaverton, Oregon
Male actors from Portland, Oregon
Male actors from Detroit
Deaths from pneumonia in Oregon
Musicians from Portland, Oregon
20th-century American pianists
20th-century American male actors
Jazz musicians from Michigan
20th-century American male musicians
American male jazz musicians
United States Army officers